Marco Mendicino  (born July 28, 1973) is a Canadian politician who has been the Minister of Public Safety since October 26, 2021. A member of the Liberal Party, Mendicino represents Eglinton—Lawrence in the House of Commons, sitting as a member of Parliament (MP) since 2015. He was the Minister of Immigration, Refugees and Citizenship from 2019 to 2021.

Early life
Mendicino was born to Italian immigrant parents. He studied political science at Carleton University, before attending law school at the University of Windsor. Later in his career he also studied human resources management at York University's Schulich School of Business.

As Crown counsel
Mendicino worked as a federal prosecutor for ten years, during which time he was involved in the handling of the Toronto 18 terrorism case.

He also worked for the Law Society of Upper Canada, served as the president of the Association of Justice Counsel, and taught as an adjunct professor at Osgoode Hall Law School.

Political career
Mendicino was occasional member of the Eglinton—Lawrence Liberal riding executive, and served as legal counsel to provincial Liberal candidate Mike Colle's campaign in 2014.

42nd Canadian Parliament
Mendicino stood for the federal nomination for the 2015 general election. He faced a major battle for the nomination after Conservative MP Eve Adams crossed the floor to join the Liberal Party. With the support of party leader Justin Trudeau, sought the Liberal nomination in Eglinton—Lawrence. Mendicino secured the support of former interim Liberal leader Bob Rae and nearby incumbent MP Judy Sgro. He defeated Adams at the July 26, 2015, nomination meeting by 1,936 to 1,100 votes.

In the general election, Mendicino faced the incumbent Conservative MP Joe Oliver, who was Minister of Finance, as well as a surprise New Democratic Party nominee in former Saskatchewan finance minister Andrew Thomson. Mendicino attacked Thomson as a parachute candidate. Ultimately, Mendicino won the election.

On January 30, 2017, Mendicino was appointed as Parliamentary Secretary to the Minister of Justice and Attorney General of Canada serving under Jody Wilson-Raybould.

On August 31, 2018, he became Parliamentary Secretary to the Minister of Infrastructure and Communities serving under François-Philippe Champagne.

43rd Canadian Parliament
Mendicino was re-elected in the 2019 federal election and subsequently named Minister of Immigration, Refugees and Citizenship.

44th Canadian Parliament 
Mendicino was re-elected in the 2021 federal election, and made Minister of Public Safety on October 26.

Emergencies Act

Minister Mendicino oversaw the first ever invocation of the Emergencies Act in response to the 2022 Freedom Convoy protests in February 2022. Scrutiny from media and opposition followed regarding whether the use of the Act was necessary.

Media questioned whether law enforcement asked for the Act's use. This question stems from testimony on 26 April before the DEDC committee, in which he noted in response to a question from Bloc Quebecois MP Rheal Fortin that the government "invoked the act because it was the advice of non-partisan professional law enforcement that the existing authorities were ineffective at the time to restore public safety." In response to questions from Liberal MP Rachel Bendayan he said: 

Mendicino then addressed the media's questions surrounding cabinet confidence, and whether this provision would be lifted for the purposes of the public inquiry that is written into the Emergencies Act, called the Rouleau inquiry.

On April 27, Prime Minister Justin Trudeau told the House of Commons that "police were clear that they needed tools not held by any federal, provincial or territorial law."

On 19 May 2022 Shadow Minister for Emergency Preparedness Dane Lloyd asked Mendicino about the need for the invocation of the Emergencies Act and elicited the comment that the latter "stands by previous statements that the federal government invoked the Emergencies Act on the recommendation of law enforcement officials."

On 11 May 2022 RCMP Commissioner Brenda Lucki stated under oath to the DEDC committee that "while her agency was consulted, it never requested nor recommended the [Emergency Act]'s use". On 17 May the interim Ottawa police chief Steve Bell testified at PROC committee that at he did not request the invocation of the Emergencies Act from the government. Another police service that was involved in the Freedom Convoy protests was the Ontario Provincial Police, and testimony on 24 March before the SECU committee from its commissioner Thomas Carrique led many to believe that Carrique made the request, Mendicino clarified in testimony given to the SECU committee on 17 May when he prevaricated.

Mendicino's Deputy Minister answered questions before the DEDC committee on 8 June, in which he testified that the minister "was misunderstood", and on 14 June the Official Opposition called for Mendicino to resign.

On 15 June before the DEDC committee, Minister for Emergency Preparedness Bill Blair and Minister of Finance Chrystia Freeland spoke to questions about recommendations from law enforcement  to invoke the Emergencies Act. Minister Blair notes, "I’m not aware of any recommendation of law enforcement. Quite frankly, this is a decision of government." Deputy Prime Minister Freeland said "I would like to take the personal responsibility for that decision [to invoke the Emergencies Act], it was my opinion it was the correct decision," and "a last resort". DEDC committee co-chair Fortin was unable to get a direct answer to his questions about what steps the federal government tried taking before invoking the last resort. MP and committee co-chair Matthew Green repeatedly asked whether Freeland "took notes at high-level meetings she had with bank officials about the economic measures in the emergency declaration," and after getting no response during his allotted time for questions, a frustrated Green said "that is unreal."

Chinese Interference in Canada's Democracy 
On February 19, 2023 while speaking to Mercedes Stephenson of Global News' The West Block, Public Safety Minister Marco Mendicino refused to answer whether the panel appointed to review the integrity of recent federal elections ever saw the CSIS intelligence reports that warned of attempts by China at election interference. In the interview, Mendicino stated: “We’ve always been up front with the fact that there is foreign interference, that we need to be eyes wide open and vigilant about it”.

On March 10, 2023 Minister Mendicino held a press conference on to announce that the Liberal Government would begin consultations on foreign influence registry to combat Chinese interference. He took questions from the media surrounding the lack of timeline for the project, and why Canada is not acting faster, when other commonwealth nations have had established registries for foreign influence for years.

Electoral record

References

External links
 Official site
 Bio & mandate from the Prime Minister
 

1973 births
Living people
Canadian people of Italian descent
Carleton University alumni
Canadian prosecutors
Lawyers in Ontario
Liberal Party of Canada MPs
Members of the House of Commons of Canada from Ontario
Members of the 29th Canadian Ministry
Members of the King's Privy Council for Canada
Academic staff of the Osgoode Hall Law School
People from Old Toronto
Politicians from Toronto
University of Windsor alumni
York University alumni
University of Windsor Faculty of Law alumni
21st-century Canadian politicians